Victor Klein may refer to:

 Victor Klein (Danish footballer)
 Víctor Klein (Chilean footballer)